The 1992 Summer Paralympics medal table is a list of National Paralympic Committees (NPCs) ranked by the number of gold medals won by their athletes during the 1992 Summer Paralympics, held in Barcelona, Spain, from September 3 to September 14, 1992.

Medal table

The ranking in this table is based on information provided by the International Paralympic Committee (IPC) and is consistent with IPC convention in its published medal tables. By default, the table is ordered by the number of gold medals the athletes from a nation have won (in this context, a "nation" is an entity represented by a National Paralympic Committee). The number of silver medals is taken into consideration next and then the number of bronze medals. If nations are still tied, equal ranking is given and they are listed alphabetically by IPC country code.

This medal table includes also the 1992 Paralympic Games for Persons with mental handicap, which held by the same organizing committee, and is part of same event, but in Madrid, between 15-22 September in the same year.

See also
 1992 Summer Olympics medal table
 1992 Winter Paralympics medal table

References

External links
International Paralympic Committee

Medal table
Summer Paralympics medal tables